"Satin Boys, Flaming Chic" is a limited edition 7" vinyl picture single by British duo Goldfrapp. The single features a remix of the band's song "Satin Chic" from their third album Supernature (2005) and a cover version of The Ordinary Boys' "Boys Will Be Boys", as performed on BBC Radio 1's Live Lounge on 27 April 2006. The single was released in the United Kingdom on 4 September 2006.

Formats and track listings
These are the formats and track listings of major single releases of "Satin Boys, Flaming Chic".

 7" picture disc (UK) / digital single
 "Satin Chic" (Through the Mystic Mix, Dimension 11 by The Flaming Lips) - 3:20
 "Boys Will Be Boys" - 2:55

Notes

2006 singles
Electronic songs
Goldfrapp songs
Mute Records singles
2005 songs
Songs written by Alison Goldfrapp
Songs written by Will Gregory